Lysophospholipase-like 1 is a protein in humans that is encoded by the LYPLAL1 gene.
 The protein is a α/β-hydrolase of uncharacterized metabolic function. Genome-wide association studies in humans have linked the gene to fat distribution and waist-to-hip ratio. The protein's enzymatic function is unclear. LYPLAL1 was reported to act as a triglyceride lipase in adipose tissue and another study suggested that the protein may play a role in the depalmitoylation of calcium-activated potassium channels. However, LYPLAL1 does not depalmitoylate the oncogene Ras and a structural and enzymatic study concluded that LYPLAL1 is generally unable to act as a lipase and is instead an esterase that prefers short-chain substrates, such as acetyl groups. Structural comparisons have suggested that LYPLAL1 might be a protein deacetylase, but this has not been experimentally tested.

Relationship to acyl-protein thioesterases 
Sequence conservation and structural homology suggest a close relationship of LYPLAL1 proteins to acyl-protein thioesterases, and, therefore, it has been suggested that LYPLAL1 might be the third human acyl-protein thioesterase. However, the major structural difference between both protein families has been established in the hydrophobic substrate binding tunnel, which has been identified in human acyl-protein thioesterases 1 and 2, as well as in Zea mays acyl-protein thioesterase 2. In LYPLAL1, this tunnel is closed due to a different loop conformation, changing the enzyme's substrate specificity to short acyl chains.

Model organisms 

Model organisms have been used in the study of LYPLAL1 function. A conditional knockout mouse line called Lyplal1tm1a(KOMP)Wtsi was generated at the Wellcome Trust Sanger Institute. Male and female animals underwent a standardized phenotypic screen to determine the effects of deletion. Additional screens performed:  - In-depth immunological phenotyping

References

Further reading 

Genes on human chromosome 1